In international relations, regional hegemony is the hegemony (political, economic, or military predominance, control or influence) of one independently powerful state, known as the regional hegemon over other neighboring countries. The relationship between regional hegemons and the other states within their spheres of influence is analogous to the relationship between a global hegemon and the other states in the international system.

The prominent international relations scholar John Mearsheimer writes extensively about the pursuit of regional hegemony in his book, The Tragedy of Great Power Politics. According to his theory, known as offensive realism, the anarchic nature of the international system, the desire for survival, and the uncertainty about other states' intentions ultimately lead states to pursue regional hegemony. According to Mearsheimer, global hegemony is an unattainable goal; instead, a state which has achieved the level of regional hegemon will then work to prevent the development of peer competitors in other regions.

Contemporary examples

Contemporary examples are often politically sensitive or arguable. Often analysis of regional hegemons are based on a specific context or perspective which renders their identification subjective. The United States is a clear example of a regional hegemon in the Americas.

See also
 Counterhegemony
 Great power
Superpower
 Hegemony
 Middle power
 Regional power
 Sphere of influence
 List of periods of regional peace (e.g. Pax Romana)

References

Further reading
 David R. Mares. 1988. "Middle Powers under Regional Hegemony: To Challenge or Acquiesce in Hegemonic Enforcement." International Studies Quarterly. 32(4):453–471.
 William Zimmerman. 1978. "Hierarchical Regional Systems and the Politics of System Boundaries." International Organization. 26(1):18–36.

External links
 Challenges to U.S. Global and Regional Hegemony and Implications for the Post-Cold War International System (University of Illinois Conference)

 
Geopolitical rivalry
International relations theory